Favières is a commune in the Somme department in Hauts-de-France in northern France.

Geography

Railway
Favières is served by a halt on the metre gauge railway from Noyelles-sur-Mer to Le Crotoy. The railway is now a heritage railway, the Chemin de Fer de la Baie de Somme, which formerly formed part of the Réseau des Bains de Mer.

Personalities
 Aeronautical engineering pioneers Gaston Caudron (1882) and René Caudron (1884) were born in Favières.

Population

See also
Communes of the Somme department

References

External links

 Caudron brothers website 

Communes of Somme (department)